Hootenanny is a folk-music party.

Hootenanny may also refer to:

Film and television
 Hootenanny (TV series), a 1960s television program
 Hootenanny Hoot, a 1963 film
 Jools Annual Hootenanny, a British New Year's Eve music show

Music 
 Hootenanny Singers, a Swedish folk group
 Hootenanny Trio, a Finnish folk group; see Helsinki Folk Festival
 An acoustic guitar manufactured by Framus

Albums 
 Hootenanny (The Replacements album), 1983
 Hootenanny (The Country Gentlemen album), 1963
 Live at the Hootenanny, Vol. 1, a 2000 compilation album from the Hootenanny Festival
 Bluegrass Hootenanny, a 1964 album by George Jones

Songs 
"Hootenanny", a 1963 song by The Glencoves
"Hootenanny", by HLAH from the 1995 album Double Your Strength, Improve Your Health, & Lengthen Your Life

Other Uses 
Hootenanny (store), a US clothing store owned by Newbury Comics
 A Dutch baby pancake, a baked pancake variety

See also
 
 Shootenanny!, a 2003 album by Eels